SIGSAM is the ACM Special Interest Group on Symbolic and Algebraic Manipulation. It publishes the ACM Communications in Computer Algebra and often sponsors the International Symposium on Symbolic and Algebraic Computation (ISSAC).

External links
 ACM Official SIGSAM web site
 ISSAC 2009, Seoul, Korea 
 ISSAC 2008, ("RISC Linz"), Hagenberg, Austria
 ISSAC 2007, Waterloo, Ontario
 ISSAC 2006, Genoa
 ISSAC 2005, Beijing
 ISSAC 2004, Santander, Cantabria
 ISSAC 2003, Philadelphia
 ISSAC 2002, Lille
 ISSAC 2001, London, Ontario
 ISSAC 2000, St. Andrews
 ISSAC 1999, Vancouver
 ISSAC 1998, Rostock
 ISSAC 1997, Maui

Association for Computing Machinery Special Interest Groups
Computer algebra systems